Seleuš (Serbian Cyrillic: Селеуш, Romanian: Seleuș) is a village in Vojvodina, Serbia. It is situated in the Banat region. The population of the village is 1515 according to the 2002 census.

Name
In Serbian, the village is known as Seleuš (Селеуш), in Romanian as Seleuș, in Croatian as Seleuš, in Hungarian as Keviszőlős, Kévisszöllö or Csigérszöllös, and in German as Selleusch.

Historical population

References

Slobodan Ćurčić, Broj stanovnika Vojvodine, Novi Sad, 1996.

External links

Official Website of Seleuš

Populated places in South Banat District
Populated places in Serbian Banat
Alibunar